This is a list of cities and airports that ALMA de México served (as of June 2008):

Mexico

Aguascalientes
Aguascalientes (Lic. Jesús Terán Peredo International Airport)

Baja California
Tijuana (General Abelardo L. Rodríguez International Airport) focus city

Baja California Sur
La Paz (Manuel Márquez de León International Airport)

Campeche
Campeche (Ing. Alberto Acuña Ongay International Airport)

Chiapas
Tuxtla Gutierrez (Angel Albino Corzo International Airport)

Chihuahua
Chihuahua (General Roberto Fierro Villalobos International Airport)
Ciudad Juárez (Abraham González International Airport)

Coahuila
Torreón (Francisco Sarabia International Airport)

Guanajuato
 León (Del Bajío International Airport)

Estado de México
Toluca (Lic. Adolfo López Mateos International Airport)

Jalisco
Guadalajara (Don Miguel Hidalgo y Costilla International Airport) Hub
Puerto Vallarta (Lic. Gustavo Díaz Ordaz International Airport)

Michoacan
Morelia (General Francisco J. Mujica International Airport)

Nuevo León
Monterrey (General Mariano Escobedo International Airport)

Oaxaca
Oaxaca (Xoxocotlán International Airport)

Puebla
Puebla (Hermanos Serdán International Airport)

Querétaro
Querétaro (Querétaro International Airport)

Quintana Roo
Cancún (Cancún International Airport)
Chetumal (Chetumal International Airport)

Sinaloa
Los Mochis (Federal del Valle del Fuerte International Airport)
Mazatlán (General Rafael Buelna International Airport)

Tabasco
Villahermosa (Carlos Rovirosa Pérez International Airport)

Tamaulipas
Ciudad Victoria (General Pedro J. Méndez International Airport)
Reynosa (General Lucio Blanco International Airport)
Tampico (General Francisco Javier Mina International Airport)

Veracruz
Poza Rica (El Tajín National Airport)
Veracruz (General Heriberto Jara International Airport)

Yucatán
Mérida (Manuel Crescencio Rejón International Airport)

References

ALMA de Mexico